The 2015–16 Houston Baptist Huskies women's basketball team represented Houston Baptist University in the 2015–16 college basketball season. The Huskies, led by third year head coach Donna Finnie, played their home games at the Sharp Gymnasium and were members of the Southland Conference. They finished the season 14–15, 9–9 in Southland play to finish in sixth place. They lost in the first round of the Southland women's tournament to Lamar.

Media
All Houston Baptist games will be broadcast online live by Legacy Sports Network (LSN) with audio for all road games and video for all home games.

Roster

Schedule and results

|-
!colspan=9 style="background:#002366; color:#FF7F00;"| Exhibition

|-
!colspan=9 style="background:#002366; color:#FF7F00;"| Out of Conference Schedule

|-
!colspan=9 style="background:#002366; color:#FF7F00;"| Southland Conference Schedule

|-
!colspan=9 style="background:#002366; color:#FF7F00;"| Southland Conference Women's Tournament

See also
2015–16 Houston Baptist Huskies men's basketball team

References

Houston Christian Huskies women's basketball seasons
Houston Baptist
Houston Baptist Huskies basketball
Houston Baptist Huskies basketball